The Mixed team competition at the 2019 World Judo Championships was held on 1 September 2019.

Results

Finals

Repechage

Pool A

Pool B

Pool C

Pool D

Prize money
The sums listed bring the total prizes awarded to 200,000$ for the team event.

References

External links
 

Team
World Mixed Team Judo Championships
World 2019